Paracharontidae is an arachnid family within the order Amblypygi (tailless whip scorpions). Paracharontidae and the extinct Weygoldtinidae from the Carboniferous form the suborder Paleoamblypygi, the sister group to the remaining Amblypygi. The family contains two genera: The extinct Paracharonopsis Engel and Grimaldi, 2014 from the Eocene (Ypresian) aged Cambay amber of India, and Paracharon, with two extant species: Paracharon caecus Hansen, 1921 from Guinea-Bissau in West Africa, and an undescribed species from Colombia in northern South America. The placement of Paracharonopsis within the family has been questioned by some authors, who suggest that the genus may be more closely related to Euamblypygi.

References

Amblypygi
Arachnid families